The United States and South Africa currently maintain bilateral relations with one another. The United States and South Africa have been economically linked to one another since the late 18th century which has continued into the 21st century. U.S. and South Africa relations faced periods of strain throughout the 20th century due to the segregationist, white minority rule in South Africa, from 1948 to 1994. Following the end of apartheid in South Africa, the U.S. and South Africa have developed a strategically, politically, and economically beneficial relationship with one another and currently enjoy "cordial relations" despite "occasional strains". South Africa remains the United States' largest trading partner in Africa as of 2019.

History
The United States has maintained an official presence in South Africa since 1799, when an American consulate was opened in Cape Town. The U.S. Embassy is located in Pretoria, and Consulates General are in Johannesburg, Durban and Cape Town.

Boer War 
The United States remained formally neutral during the Second Boer War. Although the U.S. press and the administration of President William McKinley favored the British Empire, many Americans sympathized with the Boer republics and some traveled to South Africa to fight as foreign volunteers in the conflict. Some of these American volunteers were taken as prisoners-of-war by the British, leading to a minor diplomatic crisis until negotiations between U.S. Secretary of State John Hay and British Foreign Secretary Lord Lansdowne led to their repatriation in 1902.

Union of South Africa 
During World War I both countries fought for the Allied Powers, and U.S. President Woodrow Wilson and South African Prime Minister Jan Smuts formed a friendship at the Paris Peace Conference. Initially Smuts opposed Wilson's proposal for the League of Nations, but by the beginning of the conference shifted into one of its strongest proponents. In 1929, the United States and the Union of South Africa established official diplomatic relations. However, following World War II, both the United States and South Africa had political affairs that impacted their relations with all of the world. The United States had entered into the Cold War with the Soviet Union; while, simultaneously, the National Party in South Africa won the 1948 general election against its rival, the United Party. With the National Party in power, this meant that the segregationist policies that had been impacting South Africa had become lawful, and the Apartheid Era had begun. Due to this, the United States policies towards South Africa were altered; and, overall, the relationship between South Africa and the United States was strained until the end of apartheid rule. Following the Apartheid Era, the United States and South Africa have maintained bilateral relations.

Apartheid Era
The apartheid era began under the rule of the National Party which was elected into power in the 1948 general election. President Harry S. Truman was moderately supportive of the civil rights movement, but supported the new government as an anti-communist ally against the Soviet Union. Throughout the Apartheid Era, United States foreign policy was heavily influenced by the Cold War. During the early period of apartheid in South Africa, the United States maintained friendly relations with South Africa, which may be attributed to the anti-communist ideals held by the National Party. However, over the course of the 20th century, American-South African relations were impacted by the apartheid system in place under the National Party. At times, the United States cooperated with and maintained bilateral relations with South Africa; and, at other times, the United States took political action against it.

Cooperation

Throughout the Apartheid Era, economic ties between the United States and South Africa played a prominent role in their relations with one another. From the 1950s to the 1980s, United States exports to, imports from, and direct investment in South Africa as a whole increased. South Africa was seen as an important trade partner because it provided the United States with access to various mineral resources— like chromium, manganese, vanadium— vital for the U.S. steel industry. Aside from trade and investment, South Africa also provided a strategic location for a naval base and access to much of the African continent. In addition, the United States had a NASA missile tracking station located in South Africa, which became controversial in American politics due to segregation being practiced on the stations in compliance with apartheid policy. In the early 1950s the South African Air Force supported the United States during the Korean War by fighting on the side of the United Nations Command.

Resistance
Following the Sharpeville Massacre in 1960, the United States relations with South Africa began to undergo changes.  In 1963, under the Kennedy Administration, the United States voluntarily placed an arms embargo on South Africa in cooperation with the United Nations Security Council Resolution 181. After President Kennedy's assassination and under Lyndon B. Johnson, the United States policy towards South Africa was greatly impacted by the Civil Rights Movement taking place at home. In regards to the African struggles in Africa, President Johnson shared that: 
 The foreign policy of the United States is rooted in its life at home. We will not permit human rights to be restricted in our own country. And we will not support policies abroad which are based on the rule of minorities or the discredited notion that men are unequal before the law. We will not live by a double standard—professing abroad what we do not practice at home, or venerating at home what we ignore abroad.

The primary political action taken by the Johnson Administration was the implementation of National Security Action Memorandum 295 in 1963. This, in short, aimed to promote change in apartheid policy in South Africa whilst still maintaining economic relations. Similarly, in 1968, the Johnson Administration created a National Policy Paper which discussed the U.S. political objectives of balancing a bilateral economic relationship with South Africa, while also promoting the end of apartheid in South Africa.

Despite rhetorical opposition to apartheid, the United States continued to block sanctions against South Africa at the United Nations in the 1960s and the 1970s. Although controversial, most scholars agree that Richard Nixon and Gerald R. Ford failed to combat apartheid policy in South Africa. President Jimmy Carter is known for its confrontational strategy against apartheid and white rule in South Africa. However, although the Carter Administration advocated for human rights in South Africa, most scholars agree that it was unsuccessful in creating change in South Africa. The Carter Administration feared that divestment of American companies in South Africa could have worsened the conditions for the black majority, while strengthening the position of the white minority in South Africa. This resulted in the Carter Administration refraining from placing sanctions—often promoted by the anti-apartheid movement—on South Africa, and lead to growth in investments in South Africa.

Throughout the Johnson, Nixon, Ford, and Carter administrations, the United States anti-apartheid movement as well as divestment from South Africa campaigns increasingly gained support from the American public. The growth of the anti-apartheid movement as well as the divestment campaign lead to increased pressure on the U.S. government to take action against apartheid policy in South Africa. It is during this time— when these movements had more support than ever before— that the Reagan Administration came into office.

President Ronald Reagan practiced a policy of "constructive engagement" to gently push South Africa toward a moral racially sensitive regime. The policy had been developed by State Department official Chester Crocker as part of a larger policy of cooperation with South Africa to address regional turmoil. It also supported South Africa in the South African Border War and the Angolan Civil War, in which Cuba had intervened to assist the MPLA. However, anger was growing in the United States, with leaders in both parties calling for sanctions to punish South Africa. Lawrence Eagleburger, Reagan's Under Secretary of State for Political Affairs, in June 1983 announced a clear shift in policy to an insistence upon fundamental change in Pretoria's racial policy, as the Reagan administration had to confront growing congressional and public support for sanctions.  The new policy was inadequate to such anti-apartheid leaders as Archbishop Desmond Tutu. Weeks after it was announced that he had been awarded the 1984 Nobel Peace Prize he went to the United States and denounced the Reagan administration's policy as inherently immoral. On 4 December 1984, he told the U.S. House Subcommittee on Africa:
 Apartheid is an evil as immoral and unchristian in my view as Nazism, and in my view the Reagan administration's support in collaboration with it is equally immoral, evil, and totally unchristian, without remainder.

However, on 7 December, Tutu met face-to-face with Reagan at the White House. They agreed that apartheid was repugnant and should be dismantled by peaceful means. Because efforts at constructive engagement had not succeeded in altering South Africa's policy of apartheid, Washington D.C. had to adapt this policy. 
In 1986, despite President Reagan's effort to veto it, the Comprehensive Anti-Apartheid Act of 1986 (CAAA) was enacted by United States Congress. This act was the first in this era that not only implemented economic sanctions, but also offered to aid to the victims living under apartheid rule. The Comprehensive Anti-Apartheid Act was the starting point for unified policy towards South Africa in United States politics. Under the Reagan, Clinton, and Bush administrations, there were continued efforts to try to end apartheid. These efforts gained more traction after the end of the Cold War and the Cuban withdrawal from the Angolan Civil War, which removed the United States's incentive to support the apartheid regime. By 1994, apartheid in South Africa had officially ended. Nelson Mandela was elected as the first president of this newly democratic nation.

Post-apartheid

Since the abolition of apartheid and the first-ever democratic elections of April 1994, the United States has enjoyed a bilateral relationship with South Africa.  Although there are differences of position between the two governments (regarding Iraq, for example), they have not impeded cooperation on a broad range of key issues.  Bilateral cooperation in counter-terrorism, fighting HIV/AIDS, and military relations has been particularly positive. Through the U.S. Agency for International Development (USAID), the United States also provides assistance to South Africa to help them meet their developmental goals.  Peace Corps volunteers began working in South Africa in 1997.

Harry Schwarz, who served as South African Ambassador to the United States during its transition to representative democracy (1991–1994), has been credited as having played one of the leading roles in the renewal of relations between the two nations. South African journalist Peter Fabricius described Schwarz as having "engineered a state of US/South Africa relations better than it has ever been”. The fact that Schwarz, for decades a well known anti-apartheid figurehead, was willing to accept the position was widely acknowledged as a highly symbolic demonstration of President F. W de Klerk's determination to introduce a new democratic system. During Schwarz's tenure, he negotiated the lifting of US sanctions against South Africa, secured a $600 million aid package from President Bill Clinton, signed the Nuclear Non-Proliferation Treaty in 1991 and hosted President Mandela's state visit to the US in October 1994.

During the presidency of Thabo Mbeki (1999–2008) relations were strained due to a combination of the ANC's paranoia around alleged CIA activities in the country and perceived criticism of Mbeki's AIDS denialism, a feeling partly based on the ANC's experiences of tacit American support for the Apartheid government during the Reagan administration.   The Bush administration's wars in Afghanistan and Iraq as well as its PEPFAR initiative (that clashed with Mbeki's views on AIDS) served to alienate the South African presidency until president Mbeki left government in 2008. Until 2008, the United States had officially considered Nelson Mandela a terrorist, however on 5 July 2008 Mandela along with as other ANC members including the then current foreign minister were removed from a US  terrorist watch list. 

On 28 January 2009, newly elected US President Barack Obama telephoned his newly installed counterpart Kgalema Motlanthe as one of a list of foreign contacts he had been working through since his presidential inauguration the previous week.  Given primary treatment was South Africa's role in helping to resolve the political crisis in Zimbabwe.  According to White House spokesman Robert Gibbs, the pair "shared concerns" on the matter. Obama credited South Africa for holding "a key role" in resolving the Zimbabwean crisis, and said that he was looking forward to working with President Motlanthe to address global financial issues at the 2009 G-20 London summit.

The election of Obama along with Mbeki's departure from office as well as the enactment of the African Growth and Opportunity Act (AGOA) with South Africa as a key beneficiary greatly improved opinions within the South African government of its relationship with the United States.  As of 2014 the relationship between South Africa and the United States in the Zuma/Obama years is thought not to be as close as it was during the Mandela/Clinton years but greatly improved since the Mbeki/Bush years. The Zuma years coincided with a continuation of cooling of South Africa–United States relations whilst China–South Africa relations warmed significantly as South Africa focused diplomatic efforts supporting the BRICS initiative.

During the Trump administration relations between the two countries cooled again due to President Donald Trump's comments on South African land reform policies, farm attacks and the listing of South Africa as one of ten countries with the "worst record" of supporting US positions in the United Nations. The publication of the list was accompanied with the statement that the Trump administration was considering cutting off American aid to listed countries such as South Africa.

The Russia's 2022 invasion of Ukraine added additional tensions to bilateral relations between the two countries. The United States strongly supported Ukraine and criticized Russia's invasion whilst South Africa adopted a neutral policy that was friendlier towards Russia by being critical of punitive economic sanctions imposed on Russia, avoiding criticizing Russia's actions and calling for a negotiated compromise between Russia and Ukraine that took into consideration Russia's security concerns. South Africa's stance caused concern amongst American policy makers, nevertheless South African President Cyril Ramaphosa met with U.S. President Joe Biden at the White House in September 2022.

Economic relations

Trade and investment 
Bilateral trade between South Africa and the U.S. increased in 2021 to $24.5 billion, with a trade imbalance of $9.3 billion in South Africa's favour. Industrial supplies and materials were the largest component of trade flows in both directions. South Africa is also a net beneficiary of investment links between the countries. The stock of South African investment in the U.S. has more than doubled since 2011, amounting to $3.5 billion in 2020, while U.S. direct investment in South Africa increased about 70% over that period, to $10 billion in 2020. This made the U.S. South Africa's fifth largest source of foreign direct investment in 2019, while the U.S. was its third largest destination for outward foreign direct investment. In the same year, U.S. investment in South Africa was concentrated in manufacturing, finance and insurance, and wholesale trade; and American multinationals operating in South Africa employed an estimated 134,600 people.

Formal agreements 
South Africa and the U.S. signed a formal bilateral Trade and Investment Framework Agreement in 1999, amended in 2012. They are also bound by the Trade, Investment, and Development Cooperative Agreement signed in 2008 between the U.S. and the Southern African Customs Union (of which South Africa is a member), though this was only a limited substitute for the more extensive reciprocal SACU–U.S. trade agreement envisaged in earlier years before negotiations stalled. The U.S. has direct trade and investment promotion agreements with two individual South African provincial governments, in the Western Cape and Gauteng, signed in 2021 and 2022 respectively. Other preferential trade benefits accrue to South Africa under the U.S. Generalized System of Preferences programme, although in 2020 the U.S. reclassified it as a developed country (rather than a developing country) for the purposes of U.S. trade remedies legislation and countervailing duty investigations.

Thriving economic links between the countries are also attributed in large part to the African Growth and Opportunity Act (AGOA), under which South Africa is eligible for preferential benefits and additionally for special textiles and apparel benefits. The Trade Law Centre for Southern Africa estimates that South Africa has been the biggest beneficiary of AGOA in terms of non-oil trade. But AGOA has also led to bilateral trade disputes. In 2015, the U.S. attempted to use the threat of South Africa's exclusion from AGOA to lobby against the passage of the Private Security Industry Regulation Amendment Bill, which would have required 51% South African ownership in all security companies operating in the country, to the detriment of American firms.

Chicken wars 
AGOA was also invoked as a negotiating instrument during the so-called "chicken wars" of the early 2010s, after South Africa imposed anti-dumping measures on certain U.S. chicken imports. U.S. politicians, especially those hailing from the segment of the U.S. Congress known as the "Chicken Caucus", lobbied for South Africa's exclusion from AGOA as a retaliatory measure. South Africa was included in the extended AGOA from 2015, but in November U.S. President Barack Obama provided 60-day notice of his intent to suspend AGOA agricultural benefits to South Africa unless the poultry barriers were removed. The countries reached a deal in early 2016 which opened the South African market to American chicken.

Diplomatic visits 

Under the National Party apartheid government, South African and American heads of state did not exchange visits, with the exception of two visits by F.W. De Klerk. However, three American Secretaries of State visited South Africa during that period: Henry Kissinger (1976) and Cyrus Vance (April and October 1978), both to discuss Rhodesia and Namibia; and James Baker (1990), to meet with De Klerk and ANC leaders.

Diplomatic visits between the two nations increased near the end of apartheid. In February 1990, U.S. President George H. W. Bush invited both sitting South African President F.W. de Klerk and ANC leader Nelson Mandela to visit the White House. Both men accepted the invitation, with de Klerk scheduled to visit 18 June 1990 and Mandela, recently released from prison, scheduled to visit a week later. After controversy arose in South Africa, de Klerk postponed his visit.  Mandela visited Washington on 24 June 1990 and met with President Bush and other officials. He also addressed a joint session of Congress. In September, de Klerk visited Washington, the first official state visit by a South African leader.

Mandela was subsequently elected President of South Africa, and U.S. Vice President Al Gore and First Lady Hillary Clinton attended his inauguration in Pretoria in May 1994. In October of that year, Mandela returned to Washington for a state dinner hosted by U.S. President Bill Clinton.

President Clinton visited South Africa in March 1998, marking the first time a sitting U.S. president visited the country. Since Clinton's visit, two of his successors have visited the country: President George W. Bush visited in July 2003, and President Barack Obama visited the country twice, in June 2013 (for a state visit) and in December of the same year (for the funeral of Mandela), with the latter being joined by 3 former presidents: Bush, Clinton and Jimmy Carter.

Former Vice President (2009 to 2017) and current President Joe Biden has also travelled to the country in June 2010, to attend the opening ceremony of the 2010 FIFA World Cup.

List of visits 
The following is a list of visits by South African heads of state to the U.S. and by American heads of state to South Africa.

Principal officials

Principal U.S. officials
 Ambassador – Reuben Brigety
 Deputy Chief of Mission – Jessica Lapenn
 Commercial Counselor – Pamela Ward
 Economic Counselor – Alan Tousignant
 Political Counselor – Ian McCary
 Management Counselor – Russell LeClair
 Public Affairs Counselor – Craig Dicker
 Defense and Air Attache – Colonel Michael Muolo
 USAID Director – Carleene Dei
 Agricultural Attache – Jim Higgiston
 Health Attache – Stephen Smith
 Consul General Cape Town – Virginia Blaser
 Consul General Durban –  Sherry Zalika Sykes
 Consul General Johannesburg – Michael McCarthy

Principal South African officials
 Ambassador – Mninwa Johannes Mahlangu

See also

 South African Americans
 Foreign relations of South Africa
 Foreign relations of the United States
 Constructive engagement
 Comprehensive Anti-Apartheid Act of 1986
 Free South Africa Movement

Notes

References
 Agence France-Presse. "Obama phones Motlanthe." News24, 29 January 2009.

Further reading
 Davies, J. E.  Constructive Engagement? Chester Crocker and American Policy in  South Africa, Namibia and Angola 1981–1988 (2008).
 Kline, Benjamin. The United States and South Africa during the Bush Administration: 1988-91" Journal of Asian & African Affairs (1993) 4#2 pp 68–83. 
 Lulat, Y. G-M. United States Relations with South Africa: A Critical Overview from the Colonial Period to the Present (2008).
 Massie, Robert. Loosing the Bonds: The United States and South Africa in the Apartheid Years (1997).
 Mitchell, Nancy. Jimmy Carter in Africa: Race and the Cold War (Stanford UP, 2016), 913pp.   excerpt
 Samson, Olugbenga. "America’s Inconsistent Foreign Policy to Africa; a Case Study of Apartheid South Africa." (MA thesis, East Tennessee State University,  2018)  online. 
 Schraeder, Peter J. United States Foreign Policy Toward Africa: Incrementalism, Crisis, and Change.  (1994).
 Thomson, Alex. U.S. Foreign Policy Towards Apartheid South Africa 1948–1994: Conflict of Interests  (Palgrave Macmillan, 2015).

Historiography
U.S. Relations with South Africa: Books, documents, reports, and monographs (1991), Westview Press, Boulder, CO. .

External links
History of South Africa – United States relations
American Chamber of Commerce in South Africa
South African Chamber of Commerce in the U.S.A.

 
United States
Bilateral relations of the United States